The Praetorian Prefecture of Gaul was one of four large prefectures into which the Late Roman Empire was divided.

History 
The prefecture was established after the death of Constantine I in 337, when the empire was split up among his sons and Constantine II received the rule of the western provinces, with a praetorian prefect as his chief aide. The prefecture comprised not only Gaul, but also of Roman Britain, Spain, and Mauretania Tingitana in Africa Proconsulare. Its territory overlapped considerably with what was once controlled by the short-lived Gallic Empire in the 260s.

After the permanent partition of the Empire in 395 into West and East spheres of control, the prefecture of Gaul continued to belong to the Western Roman Empire. Augusta Treverorum (present-day Trier in Germany) served as the prefecture's seat until 407 (or, according to other estimates, in 395), when it was transferred to Arelate (Arles).

The prefecture continued to function until 477, when the last areas under its control were seized by the Visigoths after the abolition of the Western imperial government of Ravenna in the previous year.

In 510, the Ostrogoth king Theodoric the Great re-established the prefecture in the small part of Gaul (the Provence) that he had just conquered, with headquarters again at Arelate. This short lived revival lasted until the area was in turn conquered by the Franks in 536, while the Ostrogoths were occupied by the East Roman invasion of Italy.

List of known praefecti praetorio Galliarum

4th century
 Junius Bassus (318-331)
 C. Caelius Saturninus (331-335)
 C. Annius Tiberianus (335-337)  
 Aurelius Ambrosius (337-340)
 Aconius Catullinus Philomathius (341, uncertain whether he was prefect of Gaul)
 Fabius Titianus (341-350)
 Vulcacius Rufinus (353-354)
 Gaius Ceionius Rufius Volusianus Lampadius (354-355)
 Honoratus (355-357)
 Flavius Florentius (c. 357-360)
 Nebridius (360-361)
 Decimius Germaniacus (361)
 Sallustius (in 363)
 Sextus Claudius Petronius Probus (366)
 Vulcacius Rufinus (2nd term, (366-368)
 Viventius (368-371)
 Maximinus (371-376) 
 Flavius Claudius Antonius (376-377)
 Ausonius (377-378, co-prefect from 376)
 Siburius (378-382)
 Mallius Theodorus (382-383)
 Euodius (c. 384-386)
 Constantinianus (389)
 Neoterius (390)
 Hilarius (396)
 Theodorus (396/397)
 Flavius Vincentius (397-400)

5th century
 Andromachus (c. 401)
 Claudius Postumus Dardanus (1st term, c. 402)
 Romulianus (404-405)
 Petronius (402-408) - seat of the prefecture moved to Arelate in 407
 Limenius (408) - assassinated at Ticinum (Pavia)
 Apollinaris (408)
 Decimus Rusticus (409-411)
 Claudius Postumus Dardanus (2nd term, 412-413)
 Vicentius (413)
 Iulius (c. 414)
 Agricola (416-418)
 Exuperantius (421-424)
 Amatus (c. 425)
 Flavius Aetius (426-c. 427)
 Auxiliaris (435-437)
 Avitus (c. 439)
 Florentius (439)
 Caecina Decius Aginatius Albinus (440)
 Marcellus (c. 441-445)
 Tonantius Ferreolus (450/451-453)
 Priscus Valerianus (before 456)
 Paeonius (456-458)
 Magnus (459-460)
 Arvandus (461-465, 467-468)
 Magnus (469)
 Magnus Felix (c. 470)
 Eutropius (c. 471)
 Polemius (475-after 477) - the last remnants of the prefecture in the Provence were conquered by the Visigoths

6th century
 Petrus Marcellinus Felix Liberius (510-536) - Prefect under Ostrogothic rule

References

Sources 
 

 
4th century in Roman Gaul
5th century in sub-Roman Gaul
6th century in Francia
Hispania
Roman Britain
Mauretania Tingitana
337 establishments